The 2023 Youngstown State Penguins baseball team are a baseball team that represents Youngstown State University in the 2023 NCAA Division I baseball season. The Penguins are members of the Horizon League and play their home games at Eastwood Field in Niles, Ohio. They are led by seventh-year head coach Dan Bertolini.

Previous season
The Penguins finished the 2022 NCAA Division I baseball season 21–36 overall (12–16 conference) and fifth place in the conference standings, qualifying for the 2022 Horizon League Baseball Tournament, where they were eliminated in the semi-finals after going 2–2.

Preseason
Following the season, Jake Marinelli left to take the head baseball coaching position with Keuka College. On August 4, 2022, Marinelli was replaced by former Penguin's pitcher, Collin Floyd.

Preseason Horizon poll
For the 2023 poll, Youngstown State was projected to finish in fourth in the Conference.

Roster

Schedule

! style="" | Regular Season
|- valign="top"

|- align="center" bgcolor="#ffcccc"
| 1 || February 17 || || vs  || David F. Couch Ballpark • Winston-Salem, North Carolina || 6–9 || Constertina (1–0) || Shaffer (0–1) || Vera (1) || 164 || 0–1 || –
|- align="center" bgcolor="#ffcccc"
| 2 || February 17 || || at #5  || David F. Couch Ballpark • Winston-Salem, North Carolina || 3–9 || Keener (1–0) || Mikos (0–1) || None || 1,004 || 0–2 || –
|- align="center" bgcolor="#ffcccc"
| 3 || February 18 || || vs Illinois || David F. Couch Ballpark • Winston-Salem, North Carolina || 5–10 || Wenninger (1–0) || Perez (0–1) || None || 172 || 0–3 || –
|- align="center" bgcolor="#ffcccc"
| 4 || February 19 || || at #5 Wake Forest || David F. Couch Ballpark • Winston-Salem, North Carolina || 3–18 || Massey (1–0) || Shaffer (0–2) || None || 307 || 0–4 || –
|- align="center" bgcolor="#ccffcc"
| 5 || February 24 || || at  || FedExPark • Memphis, Tennessee || 6–2 || Perry (1–0) || Fowler (0–1) || Gumto (1) || 244 || 1–4 || –
|- align="center" bgcolor="#ffcccc"
| 6 || February 25 || || at Memphis || FedExPark • Memphis, Tennessee || 9–13 || Warren (2–0) || Perez (0–2) || None || 212 || 1–5 || –
|- align="center" bgcolor="#ffcccc"
| 7 || February 25 || || at Memphis || FedExPark • Memphis, Tennessee || 1–3 || Durham (1–0) || Mikos (0–2) || Kendrick (1) || 267 || 1–6 || –
|- align="center" bgcolor="#ffcccc"
| 8 || February 26 || || at Memphis || FedExPark • Memphis, Tennessee || 5–6 || Kendrick (1–0) || Gumto (0–1) || None || 296 || 1–7 || –
|-

|- align="center" bgcolor="#ccffcc"
| 9 || March 3 || || at  || Baylor Ballpark • Waco, Texas || 7–5 || Anderson (1–0) || Stasio (1–2) || Marshalwitz (1) || 1,916 || 2–7 || –
|- align="center" bgcolor="#ffcccc"
| 10 || March 4 || || at Baylor || Baylor Ballpark • Waco, Texas || 5–12 || Petrowski (1–0) || Misik (0–1) || None || 2,045 || 2–8 || –
|- align="center" bgcolor="#ccffcc"
| 11 || March 4 || || at Baylor || Baylor Ballpark • Waco, Texas || 7–5 || English (1–0) || Oliver (1–1) || None || 2,045 || 3–8 || –
|- align="center" bgcolor="#ffcccc"
| 12 || March 5 || || at Baylor || Baylor Ballpark • Waco, Texas || 7–9 || Calder (1–0) || Gebhardt (0–1) || Golomb (1) || 1,709 || 3–9 || –
|- align="center" bgcolor="#ffcccc"
| 13 || March 7 || || at  || Schoonover Stadium • Kent, Ohio || 1–22 || Longwell (1–0) || Anderson (1–1) || None || 221 || 3–10 || –
|- align="center" bgcolor="#ffcccc"
| 14 || March 10 || || at  || Tointon Family Stadium • Manhattan, Kansas || 4–20 || Boerema (2–0) || Perry (1–1) || None || 1,183 || 3–11 || –
|- align="center" bgcolor="#ffcccc"
| 15 || March 11 || || at Kansas State || Tointon Family Stadium • Manhattan, Kansas || 6–9 || Hartis (2–0) || Pancake (0–1) || Neighbors (1) || 1,212 || 3–12 || –
|- align="center" bgcolor="#ffcccc"
| 16 || March 12 || || at Kansas State || Tointon Family Stadium • Manhattan, Kansas || 2–16 || Buss (1–0) || English (1–1) || None || 1,268 || 3–13 || –
|- align="center" bgcolor=
| 17 || March 17 || ||  || Eastwood Field • Niles, Ohio || – || – || – || – || – || – || –
|- align="center" bgcolor=
| 18 || March 18 || || Oakland || Eastwood Field • Niles, Ohio || – || – || – || – || – || – || –
|- align="center" bgcolor=
| 19 || March 19 || || Oakland || Eastwood Field • Niles, Ohio || – || – || – || – || – || – || –
|- align="center" bgcolor=
| 20 || March 22 || || at  || Steller Field • Bowling Green, Ohio || – || – || – || – || – || – || –
|- align="center" bgcolor=
| 21 || March 24 || || at  || Franklin Field • Franklin, Wisconsin || – || – || – || – || – || – || –
|- align="center" bgcolor=
| 22 || March 25 || || at Milwaukee || Franklin Field • Franklin, Wisconsin || – || – || – || – || – || – || –
|- align="center" bgcolor=
| 23 || March 26 || || at Milwaukee || Franklin Field • Franklin, Wisconsin || – || – || – || – || – || – || –
|- align="center" bgcolor=
| 24 || March 28 || || at  || Scott Park Baseball Complex • Toledo, Ohio || – || – || – || – || – || – || –
|- align="center" bgcolor=
| 25 || March 31 || || Purdue Fort Wayne || Eastwood Field • Niles, Ohio || – || – || – || – || – || – || –
|-

|- align="center" bgcolor=
| 26 || April 1 || || Purdue Fort Wayne || Eastwood Field • Niles, Ohio || – || – || – || – || – || – || –
|- align="center" bgcolor=
| 27 || April 2 || || Purdue Fort Wayne || Eastwood Field • Niles, Ohio || – || – || – || – || – || – || –
|- align="center" bgcolor=
| 28 || April 4 || || Pittsburgh || Eastwood Field • Niles, Ohio || – || – || – || – || – || – || –
|- align="center" bgcolor=
| 29 || April 6 || ||  || Eastwood Field • Niles, Ohio || – || – || – || – || – || – || –
|- align="center" bgcolor=
| 30 || April 7 || || Northern Kentucky || Eastwood Field • Niles, Ohio || – || – || – || – || – || – || –
|- align="center" bgcolor=
| 31 || April 8 || || Northern Kentucky || Eastwood Field • Niles, Ohio || – || – || – || – || – || – || –
|- align="center" bgcolor=
| 32 || April 10 || || at Pittsburgh || Charles L. Cost Field • Pittsburgh, Pennsylvania || – || – || – || – || – || – || –
|- align="center" bgcolor=
| 33 || April 11 || || Toledo || Eastwood Field • Niles, Ohio || – || – || – || – || – || – || –
|- align="center" bgcolor=
| 34 || April 14 || || at  || Nischwitz Stadium • Fairborn, Ohio || – || – || – || – || – || – || –
|- align="center" bgcolor=
| 35 || April 15 || || at Wright State || Nischwitz Stadium • Fairborn, Ohio || – || – || – || – || – || – || –
|- align="center" bgcolor=
| 36 || April 16 || || at Wright State || Nischwitz Stadium • Fairborn, Ohio || – || – || – || – || – || – || –
|- align="center" bgcolor=
| 37 || April 18 || || at  || Medlar Field • University Park, Pennsylvania || – || – || – || – || – || – || –
|- align="center" bgcolor=
| 38 || April 19 || || Kent State || Eastwood Field • Niles, Ohio || – || – || – || – || – || – || –
|- align="center" bgcolor=
| 39 || April 21 || || at Oakland || Oakland Baseball Field • Rochester, Michigan || – || – || – || – || – || – || –
|- align="center" bgcolor=
| 40 || April 22 || || at Oakland || Oakland Baseball Field • Rochester, Michigan || – || – || – || – || – || – || –
|- align="center" bgcolor=
| 41 || April 23 || || at Oakland || Oakland Baseball Field • Rochester, Michigan || – || – || – || – || – || – || –
|- align="center" bgcolor=
| 42 || April 25 || ||  || Eastwood Field • Niles, Ohio || – || – || – || – || – || – || –
|- align="center" bgcolor=
| 43 || April 28 || || Milwaukee || Eastwood Field • Niles, Ohio || – || – || – || – || – || – || –
|- align="center" bgcolor=
| 44 || April 29 || || Milwaukee || Eastwood Field • Niles, Ohio || – || – || – || – || – || – || –
|- align="center" bgcolor=
| 45 || April 30 || || Milwaukee || Eastwood Field • Niles, Ohio || – || – || – || – || – || – || –
|-

|- align="center" bgcolor=
| 46 || May 5 || || at Purdue Fort Wayne || Mastodon Field • Fort Wayne, Indiana || – || – || – || – || – || – || –
|- align="center" bgcolor=
| 47 || May 6 || || at Purdue Fort Wayne || Mastodon Field • Fort Wayne, Indiana || – || – || – || – || – || – || –
|- align="center" bgcolor=
| 48 || May 7 || || at Purdue Fort Wayne || Mastodon Field • Fort Wayne, Indiana || – || – || – || – || – || – || –
|- align="center" bgcolor=
| 49 || May 9 || || Bowling Green || Eastwood Field • Niles, Ohio || – || – || – || – || – || – || –
|- align="center" bgcolor=
| 50 || May 12 || || at Northern Kentucky || Bill Aker Baseball Complex • Highland Heights, Kentucky || – || – || – || – || – || – || –
|- align="center" bgcolor=
| 51 || May 13 || || at Northern Kentucky || Bill Aker Baseball Complex • Highland Heights, Kentucky || – || – || – || – || – || – || –
|- align="center" bgcolor=
| 52 || May 14 || || at Northern Kentucky || Bill Aker Baseball Complex • Highland Heights, Kentucky || – || – || – || – || – || – || –
|- align="center" bgcolor=
| 53 || May 16 || || at Akron || Canal Park • Akron, Ohio || – || – || – || – || – || – || –
|- align="center" bgcolor=
| 54 || May 18 || || Wright State || Eastwood Field • Niles, Ohio || – || – || – || – || – || – || –
|- align="center" bgcolor=
| 55 || May 19 || || Wright State || Eastwood Field • Niles, Ohio || – || – || – || – || – || – || –
|- align="center" bgcolor=
| 56 || May 20 || || Wright State || Eastwood Field • Niles, Ohio || – || – || – || – || – || – || –
|}
</div></div>
|}

Awards

Horizon League Players of the Week

References

Youngstown State
Youngstown State Penguins baseball seasons
Youngstown State